Cellatica is a comune in the province of Brescia, in Lombardy.

Geography
Located at the feet of the Brescian Prealps. It is bounded by other communes of Brescia, Collebeato and Gussago.   It is located in an area, Franciacorta , traditionally known for the production of wines.

References

Cities and towns in Lombardy